Yeoh Ghim Seng  was a Singaporean politician who served as Speaker of the Parliament of Singapore between 1970 and 1989. 

He is one of the longest-serving speakers of any parliament in the world. Yeoh served briefly as the acting president of Singapore between the death of Yusof Ishak on 23 November 1970 and the inauguration of President Benjamin Sheares on 2 January 1971.

Early life
Yeoh was born on 22 June 1918 in Ipoh. He received his early education at St. Michael's Institution in his hometown of Ipoh (in Malaysia) and at Penang Free School. He studied medicine in London and Cambridge University in the 1940s, and was on attachment to hospitals in London before becoming a fellow of the Royal College of Surgeons of England in 1950. His wife, Winnie Khong, was also from Ipoh, and they married in 1941 while both were studying in England.

Career
In 1951, Yeoh returned to Malaya to become consultant surgeon to the Singapore General Hospital. When he was appointed professor of surgery at the then University of Malaya in 1955, he was one of the first locals to hold that chair. He resigned the chair in 1962 to set up what became a lucrative private practice, but continued to train medical graduates from the university. A six-footer, Yeoh was described once as "the biggest but fastest Asian surgeon".

Yeoh's political career began in 1966 when he was recruited by the People's Action Party to stand in a by-election in Joo Chiat. He won by a walkover and served as the constituency's MP for 22 years.
His preoccupation with medicine precluded a ministerial appointment; instead, he was made deputy speaker in 1968, and elected speaker two years later. In 1977, minister of law, environment, science and technology, E. W. Barker, congratulating him on his re-election to yet another term as speaker, said that if not for Yeoh's commitment to surgery, he "could with ease and distinction occupy one of the front benches on this side of the House". As speaker, Yeoh's residence was the Command House.

In 1977, he also became the ASEAN Inter-Parliamentary Organization's (AIPO) first president.

Awards and honour
Yeoh was a Public Service Star (B.B.M.) recipient, an active Rotarian, and a justice of the peace who also served as chairman of various boards including the Detainees' Aftercare Association and the University of Singapore Council. 

In 1993, the National University of Singapore created the Yeoh Ghim Seng Professorship in Surgery in his honour.

Death
Yeoh died on 3 June 1993 of lung cancer at the Singapore General Hospital. He was survived by his wife, five daughters and 15 grandchildren.

References

1918 births
Singaporean people of Hokkien descent
Singaporean people of Chinese descent
1993 deaths
Fellows of the Royal College of Surgeons
People's Action Party politicians
Speakers of the Parliament of Singapore
Presidents of Singapore